Doje Cering (born November 1939) is a Chinese politician of Tibetan ethnicity who served as chairperson of the National People's Congress Ethnic Affairs Committee from 2003 to 2008, minister of Civil Affairs from 1993 to 2003, and chairman of Tibet Autonomous Region from 1985 to 1990.

He was a member of the 12th CCP Central Commission for Discipline Inspection. He was a member of the 13th, 14th, 15th and 16th Central Committee of the Chinese Communist Party. He was a member of the Standing Committee of the 10th National People's Congress.

Biography
Doje Cering was born in Xiahe County, Gansu, in November 1939. 

He entered the workforce in August 1955, and joined the Chinese Communist Party in October 1960. During the Cultural Revolution, he suffered political persecution. He was magistrate of Gyaca County, first party secretary of Shannan, and first party secretary of Shigatse. In 1983, he was promoted to become vice chairman of Tibet Autonomous Region, rising to chairman in 1985. He served as deputy minister of Civil Affairs in May 1990, and was promoted to the minister position in March 1993. In March 2003, he was proposed as chairperson of the National People's Congress Ethnic Affairs Committee.

References

1939 births
Living people
People from Xiahe County
Tibetan politicians
People's Republic of China politicians from Gansu
Chinese Communist Party politicians from Gansu
Ministers of Civil Affairs of the People's Republic of China
Members of the Standing Committee of the 10th National People's Congress
Chairpersons of the National People's Congress Ethnic Affairs Committee
Members of the 13th Central Committee of the Chinese Communist Party
Members of the 14th Central Committee of the Chinese Communist Party
Members of the 15th Central Committee of the Chinese Communist Party
Members of the 16th Central Committee of the Chinese Communist Party